Victor is a Canadian television film, directed by Jerry Ciccoritti and broadcast by CBC Television in 2008. Written by and starring Mark Lutz, the film is a biographical drama about the life and career of Victor Davis, a Canadian Olympic swimmer who was killed in a hit and run accident just months after his retirement from competitive swimming.

The film's cast also included Polly Shannon as Davis's girlfriend Donna Clavel, Peter MacNeill as his father Mel Davis, Ron Lea as his friend Clifford Barry, Chris Owens as his friend Dave Stubbs and Sasha Roiz as his teammate Alex Baumann, as well as Lynne Cormack, Debra McCabe, R.D. Reid, Adam MacDonald, Jef Mallory, Amy Lalonde, Linda Prystawska, Devin Delorme, Glen Oomen, John Stoneham Sr., Larry Yachimec and Paula Rivera in supporting roles.

The film was broadcast on January 13, 2008.

Awards

References

External links

2008 television films
2008 films
Canadian biographical drama films
English-language Canadian films
2008 biographical drama films
CBC Television original films
Films directed by Jerry Ciccoritti
Canadian drama television films
Canadian films based on actual events
2000s Canadian films